The 18th U-boat Flotilla (German 18. Unterseebootsflottille) was a short-lived unit of Nazi Germany's Kriegsmarine during World War II.

The flotilla was formed in Hel, Poland, in January 1945 under the command of Korvettenkapitän Rudolf Franzius. Officially a training flotilla (Ger. Ausbildungsflottille), the four U-boats were in combat in the Baltic Sea. It was disbanded in March 1945.

Assigned U-boats
Four U-boats were assigned to this flotilla during its service.

References 

18
Military units and formations of the Kriegsmarine
Military units and formations established in 1945
Military units and formations disestablished in 1945